The Battle of Samana was fought between Banda Singh Bahadur and the Mughal Government of Samana in 1709. Following the battle, Banda Singh Bahadur shook the administration of Delhi.

Background
Samana was a town where executioners Sayyed Jalal-ud-din, Shashal Beg and Bashal Beg lived. Sayyed Jalal-ud-din was responsible for the execution of Sikh Guru Teg Bahadur, whereas, Shashal Beg and Bashal Beg  were responsible for the execution of Guru Gobind Singh's two children.

The Battle
The Sikh had 3,000 horsemen and 5,000 foot-soldiers. The commander of Samana had his town well defended. Banda advanced with speed during the night and reached the gates of Samana by the dawn of November 26. Once the gate-keepers were killed the whole army charged into the town. The executioners of Guru Tegh Bahadur and his grandchildren were killed. The peasantry population of the neighborhood joined Banda Singh's army of 8,000, looking to wreak vengeance upon their expropriating landlords and together with Banda and his army entered the town from all sides, killed thousands of the city's inhabitants and razed the town. Nearly 10,000 Muslims are said to have been massacred in the town and a great amount of wealth was obtained.

Aftermath 
After the successful expedition against Samana, Banda Singh Bahadur appointed Fateh Singh as the Governor of Samana. Later, some important towns on the way to Sirhind were plundered, especially as they could provide military assistance to Sirhind. Banda also forcibly took supplies from the villagers and plundered Ambala on the way. The towns of Kunjpura, Ghuram and Thaska were also destroyed by the Sikhs, which were inhabited by Muslim Ranghars, who committed atrocities against the general population.

References

Battles involving the Sikhs
Battles involving the Mughal Empire
Conflicts in 1709
1709 in Asia